Beerens is a surname. Notable people with the surname include:

Bas Beerens, Dutch entrepreneur
Roy Beerens (born 1987), Dutch footballer

See also
Behrens

Dutch-language surnames
Surnames from given names